Kykuit is a mountain in Greene County, New York. It is located in the Catskill Mountains south of Catskill. Kalkberg is located west-southwest of Kykuit.

References

Mountains of Greene County, New York
Mountains of New York (state)